Asterix & Obelix: The Middle Kingdom is a 2023 French live action adventure family comedy film directed by Guillaume Canet, who also stars as Asterix. It is the fifth installment in the Asterix film series.

The film, which co-stars Gilles Lellouche as Obelix, sees the title heroes travel to Imperial China for the first time. The original story is based on a script by Philippe Mechelen and Julien Hervé. Canet also collaborated on the script. It is the first live-action Asterix film not based on any of the Asterix comic albums or starring Gérard Depardieu as Obelix.

Shooting was originally planned to take place in 2020 in China but was delayed for a year and relocated to France due to the COVID-19 pandemic. The film is budgeted at $72.4 million and is being co-produced by Pathé, Les Enfants Terribles and Paris-based Tresor Films. It was released on the 1 February 2023.

Plot
Princess Fu Yi, the only daughter of the Chinese Emperor Han Xuandi, escapes from a rogue prince, Deng Tsin Qin, and flees to Gaul, seeking help from Asterix and Obelix.

Cast

Production

In 2016, after mixed critical and commercial success of the two previous live-action Asterix films, Asterix at the Olympic Games (2008) and Asterix and Obelix: God Save Britannia (2012), Anne Goscinny, the daughter of Asterix creator Rene Goscinny, declared the series required a reboot in terms of ideas and casting. Directors considered included Michel Hazanavicius and Franck Gastambide with a proposal to make a film based on Asterix in Corsica.

In November 2017, Le Film Français magazine revealed that Éditions Albert René, producers Alain Attal and Yohan Baiada would be making a new live-action feature film not based on an Asterix comic album and that the Gauls would venture to China, with shooting scheduled for 2020.

In October 2019, Guillaume Canet announced he would be directing the film and taking on the role of Asterix, while Gilles Lellouche would co-star as Obelix. In previous live action films of Asterix, the role of Obelix had had always been played by Gérard Depardieu, who was Asterix co-creator Albert Uderzo's preferred actor for the part. Responding to the casting of Gilles Lellouche as Obelix, Depardieu said he was not disappointed as he does not have a monopoly on the role.

Alain Attal of Tresor Films said he and Canet had visited China with French President Emmanuel Macron to present the project to Chinese authorities and be permitted to film in China, co-produce with a Chinese firm, and release the film there. Attal also said Pathé was in negotiations with a Chinese distribution and co-production partner, which would cover part of the budget. Pathé is to distribute the film in France and represent it in international markets. The film's original working title in English was Asterix and Obelix: The Silk Road.

On 18 February 2020, production was halted due to the COVID-19 pandemic. In December 2020, Lellouche said filming would not take place in China, mainly because of political reasons.

In March 2021, French media reported shooting would take place in the Guéry plateau area of Puy-de-Dôme. Casting of extras took place over March 8 to 11 in Clermont-Ferrand and on March 12 in La Bourboule, for dozens of athletic men of Asian origin, aged between 18 and 45. Casting also sought Caucasian males, aged between 18 and 25, also of athletic build or having served in the army, with a height between 1.76 and 1.83 meters. Filming commenced on 12 April 2021 at Bry-sur-Marne studios. Shooting also took place in Brétigny-sur-Orge and Morocco. On 6 August 2021, Canet announced that shooting had completed after 17 weeks.

Music

Soundtrack
 "Kung Fu Fighting"  – Cee Lo Green and Jack Black
 "We Will Rock You (Antivirus)" – Queen & Roman Soldiers
 "Deborah's Theme" (From "Once Upon a Time in America") - Ennio Morricone
 "(I've Had) The Time of My Life" – Julie Chen & Tran Vu Tran

References

External links
 

2020s French-language films
Asterix films
French adventure comedy films
French children's comedy films
2020s French films